Peter Shilton's Handball Maradona (referred to in title as Peter Shilton's Football) is a multiplatform association football simulation video game that was released in 1986 for the Amstrad CPC, Commodore 64 and ZX Spectrum. The game allows players to control legendary goalkeeper Peter Shilton. The game's title refers to the "hand of God" goal scored by Diego Maradona against England at the 1986 FIFA World Cup.

Gameplay

During the course of the game, sixteen teams, taken from what was then the top flight of English football, are available for the player to play against, while trying to improve the skill of the players through saving potential goals. Each match consists of a series of friendly games. The game can support the full names of football squads like Wolverhampton Wanderers and West Bromwich Albion.

Games are permitted to end in draws because of this rule. Like in real football, the game is divided into two halves where the player gets to make about three to four saves per half. The Commodore 64 version has some extra sound effects and some limited digitized speech.

Reception
AllGame gave the game a score of 2.5/5 stars.

References

1986 video games
Association football video games
Amstrad CPC games
Commodore 64 games
Europe-exclusive video games
ZX Spectrum games
Multiplayer and single-player video games
Video games developed in the United Kingdom
Cultural depictions of British men
Cultural depictions of association football players
Cultural depictions of Diego Maradona
Video games based on real people